Remembering Saddam is a documentary by Don North, a television news producer.

The film follows the story of nine Iraqi businessmen who were arrested in 1995 by Saddam Hussein's regime which was notorious for human rights abuses. They were charged with dealing in foreign currency and imprisoned in Abu Ghraib prison. After a short trial with no defense representation, they were sentenced to amputation of their right hands. The amputation was videotaped and used by Saddam Hussein as a deterrent to other would-be criminals. An "X of shame" was also carved into the foreheads of each man by the surgeons.

After the 2003 U.S. invasion of Iraq, North tracked down the nine men; seven of them (one was deceased) agreed to tell their stories. The documentary follows their story as organizations are lined up to donate surgical services, transportation and prosthetic limbs. Transportation was provided by Continental Airlines. Dr. Agris and Dr. Kestler of Houston donated their time.  Medical facilities were provided by Methodist Hospital in Houston. The prosthetic hands which normally cost $50,000 each were donated by Otto Bock, a German-American company.  The gruesome footage of their amputations performed by doctors in the employ of Saddam Hussein is presented in increments as the documentary unfolds. The "Xs of shame" on every man's forehead were also removed.

, Remembering Saddam is not scheduled for broadcast because North has yet to find a network willing to broadcast it.

External links
 Wall Street Journal Op-Ed
 NY Post Op-Ed

Law of Iraq
Historiography of Iraq
American documentary television films
Saddam Hussein
Documentary films about human rights
Documentary films about Iraq